The 1977 French Open was a tennis tournament that took place on the outdoor clay courts at the Stade Roland Garros in Paris, France. The tournament ran from 23 May until 5 June. It was the 81st staging of the French Open, and the second Grand Slam tennis event of 1977.

Finals

Men's singles 

 Guillermo Vilas defeated  Brian Gottfried, 6–0, 6–3, 6–0 
It was Vilas's 1st career Grand Slam title.

Women's singles 

 Mima Jaušovec defeated  Florența Mihai, 6–2, 6–7(5–7), 6–1 
It was Jaušovec's only career Grand Slam title.

Men's doubles 

 Brian Gottfried /  Raúl Ramírez defeated  Wojciech Fibak /  Jan Kodeš, 7–6, 4–6, 6–3, 6–4

Women's doubles 

 Regina Maršíková /  Pam Teeguarden defeated  Rayni Fox /  Helen Gourlay, 5–7, 6–4, 6–2

Mixed doubles 

 Mary Carillo /  John McEnroe defeated  Florența Mihai /  Iván Molina, 7–6, 6–4

Prize money

Notes

References

External links
 French Open official website

 
French Open
French Open
French Open